Fred Jurgen Schnepel (February 24, 1892 – February 7, 1948) was a Seaman in the United States Navy and a Medal of Honor recipient for his role in the United States occupation of Veracruz.

He died February 7, 1948, and is buried in Arlington National Cemetery, Arlington, Virginia.

Medal of Honor citation
Rank and organization: Ordinary Seaman, U.S. Navy. Born: 24 February 1892, New York, N.Y. Accredited to: New York. G.O. No.: 101, 15 June 1914.

Citation:

On board the U.S.S. Florida, Schnepel showed extraordinary heroism in the line of his profession during the seizure of Vera Cruz, Mexico, 21 and 22 April 1914.

See also

 List of Medal of Honor recipients (Veracruz)

References

External links

 

1892 births
1948 deaths
United States Navy Medal of Honor recipients
United States Navy sailors
Military personnel from New York City
Burials at Arlington National Cemetery
Battle of Veracruz (1914) recipients of the Medal of Honor